This is a list of notable charter airlines and leisure airlines which are in operation.

Asia

 EastIndo
 Indonesia Air Transport
 Premiair
 Susi Air

 Air Japan

 Arab Wings
 Jordan Aviation

 Sunday Airlines

 Union Express Charter Airline

 Qatar Amiri Flight

Africa

 AMC Airlines
 FlyEgypt

 748 Air Services

 Allegiance Air
 Civair
 Comair Flight Services
 Federal Air
 Global Aviation 
 King Air Charter
 Phoebus Apollo Aviation
 Safair
 Solenta Aviation

 Blue Bird Aviation

 Safari Plus

The Americas

 Air Canada Jetz
 Air Transat
 Chrono Aviation
 Summit Air

 Atlas Air
 Berry Aviation
 CSI Aviation, Inc.
 Elite Airways
 National Airlines
 NetJets
 Omni Air International
 Reliant Air
 Skymax
 Swift Air
 World Atlantic Airlines
 XOJET

Australia and Oceania

Europe

 Air Belgium
 TUI fly Belgium

 Bul Air
 BH Air
 Electra Airways
 European Air Charter
 Fly2Sky Airlines
 GullivAir

 Trade Air
 ETF Airways

 Jet Time
 Sunclass Airlines

 Corsair

Smartwings 

 FLYEST
 Smartlynx Airlines Estonia

 Condor
 Eurowings Discover
 German Airways
 TUI fly Deutschland
 Sundair

 Air Mediterranean
 Olympus Airways

 Smartwings Hungary

 Air Atlanta Icelandic

 Neos

 SmartLynx Airlines

 Heston Airlines

 Air Horizont
 AirX Charter
 Corendon Airlines Europe
 Freebird Airlines Europe
 Hi Fly Malta
 Malta MedAir

 Corendon Dutch Airlines
 TUI fly Netherlands

 Buzz
 Enter Air
 LOT Charters
 Smartwings Poland
 Royal - Star Sp. z o.o.

 Everjets
 EuroAtlantic Airways
 Hi Fly
 Orbest
 White Airways

 Air Bucharest
 Star East Airline

 Azur Air
 I-Fly
 Nordwind Airlines
 Pegas Fly
 Royal Flight

 Evelop Airlines
 Privilege Style
 Wamos Air
 World2Fly

 Smartwings Slovakia

 Aviolet

 TUI fly Nordic
 Novair

 Edelweiss Air

 Corendon Airlines
 Freebird Airlines
 Tailwind Airlines

 Azur Air Ukraine
 Windrose Airlines

 Jet2
 Titan Airways
 TUI Airways

Exceptions
Several more scheduled airlines offer or offered additional charter services as well; among them are:
 Air Inuit
 Air Tindi
 Alliance Airlines
 Champion Air
 Cinnamon Air
 Citybird
 Frontier Flying Service
 Hong Kong Airlines
 Kelowna Flightcraft Air Charter
 Ladeco
 Luzair
 Magnicharters
 Palmair
 Petra Airlines
 Rayyan Air

Defunct

Africa

 Air Leisure
 Lotus Air
 Shorouk Air

 Kabo Air
 TAT Nigeria

 Jasmin Airways

America

 Arrow Air
 Capitol Air
 Eastern Air Lines
 Miami Air International
 TransMeridian Airlines

 Skyservice
 Thomas Cook Airlines Canada

Asia

 East Star Airlines

 Rizon Jet

 RAK Airways

 Samarkand Airways

Australia and Oceania

 OzJet

Europe

 Air Adriatic

 Azur Air Germany
 LTU
 Paninternational
 Small Planet Airlines (Germany)
 SunExpress Deutschland
 Thomas Cook Aviation
 XL Airways Germany

 Eirjet
 TransAer International Airlines

 Small Planet Airlines

 Chernomor-Avia
 Dalavia
 Estar Avia
 Kogalymavia
 Transeuropean Airlines
 VIM-Avia

 Aurora Airlines

 Pyrenair

 Air Alfa
 Air Anatolia
 Akdeniz Airlines
 Albatros Airlines (Turkey)
 Ankair
 Bestair
 Birgenair
 Boğaziçi Hava Taşımacılığı
 Bosphorus Airways
 Golden International Airlines
 Holiday Airlines
 Inter Airlines
 Saga Airlines
 Sultan Air
 Sunways
 Tarhan Tower Airlines
 TUR European Airways
 Turkuaz Airlines

 Capital Airlines (UK)
 First Choice Airways
 JMC Air
 Thomas Cook Airlines
 Thomsonfly
 Virgin Sun Airlines
 XL Airways UK

See also
List of low-cost airlines
Flag carrier
List of regional airlines

References 

Airline-related lists
Charter